William E. Franklin may refer to:
 William Edwin Franklin (born 1930), Roman Catholic bishop in the USA
 William E. Franklin, editor of the magazine of the Theta Tau fraternity

See also
William Franklin (disambiguation)